The 2014 WNBA playoffs was the postseason for the 2014 WNBA season. Four teams from each of the league's two conferences qualified for the playoffs, seeded 1 to 4 in a tournament bracket, with the two opening rounds in a best-of-three format, and the final in a best-of-five format.

The Phoenix Mercury won the 2014 WNBA Finals, sweeping the Chicago Sky in three games. The Mercury defeated the Los Angeles Sparks in the conference semifinals before defeating the Minnesota Lynx in the Western Conference Finals. The Mercury lost only one game in the entire playoffs.

The Chicago Sky attempted to complete a cinderella run by upsetting the Atlanta Dream in the conference semifinals and by upsetting the Indiana Fever in the Eastern Conference Finals, both in three games. However, the Sky were unable to complete their historic playoff run, as the Mercury won their third WNBA championship title.

Tiebreak procedures

Two-team tie
 Better record in head-to-head games.
 Better winning percentage within own conference.
 Better winning percentage against all teams with .500 or better record at the end of the season.
 Better point differential in games head-to-head.
 Coin toss.

Three or more-team tie
 Better winning percentage among all head-to-head games involving tied teams.
 Better winning percentage against teams within conference (for first two rounds of playoffs) or better record against teams in the opposite conference (for Finals).
 Better winning percentage against all teams with a .500 or better record at the end of the season.
 Better point differential in games involving tied teams.
 Coin toss.

Playoff qualifying

Eastern Conference

Western Conference

Notes

Playoffs and Finals

Eastern Conference

Conference semifinals

(1) Atlanta Dream vs. (4) Chicago Sky

Regular-season series
Chicago won the regular-season series 3–2:

(2) Indiana Fever vs. (3) Washington Mystics 

Regular-season series
The regular season series was tied 2–2:

Conference finals

(2) Indiana Fever vs. (4) Chicago Sky 

Regular-season series
Indiana won the regular season series 3–2:

Western Conference

Conference semifinals

(1) Phoenix Mercury vs. (4) Los Angeles Sparks 

Regular-season series
Phoenix won the regular-season series 5–0:

(2) Minnesota Lynx vs. (3) San Antonio Stars 

Regular-season series
Minnesota won the regular-season series 4–1:

Conference finals

(1) Phoenix Mercury vs. (2) Minnesota Lynx

Regular-season series
Phoenix won the regular-season series 3–1:

WNBA Finals

Phoenix Mercury vs. Chicago Sky

Regular-season series
Phoenix won the regular-season series 2–0:

References

Women's National Basketball Association Playoffs